was a Japanese animation and computer graphics studio located in Shibuya, Tokyo, and founded in 1968 from former Mushi Pro staff. They worked on movies, videos, TV shows, and commercials, and contributed to all stages of the process, including planning, production, sound effects, and so on. The company was headed by Atsumi Tashiro until his death in July 2010. In September 2010, Group TAC filed for bankruptcy, and liquidated all of its assets. Diomedéa was formed after a split from Group TAC. Group TAC's remaining animation project, Hana Kappa, was taken over by OLM, Inc. and XEBEC.

Projects

References

External links 
 
  (in Japanese)

 
Animation studios in Tokyo
Mass media companies disestablished in 2010
Mass media companies established in 1968
Companies that have filed for bankruptcy in Japan
Defunct mass media companies of Japan
Japanese animation studios
Japanese companies disestablished in 2010
Japanese companies established in 1968